The 1976–77 DFB-Pokal was the 34th season of the annual German football cup competition. It began on 6 August 1976 and ended on 30 May 1977. 128 teams competed in the tournament of seven rounds. In the final 1. FC Köln defeated Hertha BSC 1–0 in a replay after the first game ended in a draw after 120 minutes. It was the only DFB-Pokal final ever to be replayed.

Matches

First round

Replays

Second round

Replays

Third round

Round of 16

Replay

Quarter-finals

Semi-finals

Final

References

External links
 Official site of the DFB 
 Kicker.de 
 1976–77 results at Fussballdaten.de 
 1976–77 results at Weltfussball.de 

1976-77
1976–77 in German football cups